Vukasovići  is a village in the municipality of Ilijaš, Bosnia and Herzegovina.

History
According to old gravestones from the 15th century, it is estimated that this area was inhabited even in medieval period.

Geography
 Draževići
 Gudelj
 Gornja Kustura
 Donja Kustura
 Homar
 Lokve
 Ravne

Demographics 
According to the 2013 census, its population was 100, all Bosniaks.

References

External links
http://nona.net/features/map/placedetail.892053/Vukasovi%C4%87i/

Populated places in Ilijaš